Diego Reyes (born 24 July 1992) is a Chilean handball player for ARS Palma del Río and the Chilean national team.

References

1992 births
Living people
Chilean male handball players
Place of birth missing (living people)
Handball players at the 2015 Pan American Games
Pan American Games bronze medalists for Chile
Pan American Games medalists in handball
Expatriate handball players
Chilean expatriate sportspeople in Spain
Medalists at the 2015 Pan American Games
20th-century Chilean people
21st-century Chilean people